Holospora is a genus of bacteria.

References

Alphaproteobacteria
Bacteria genera